The Company of Women is a novel by Indian author Khushwant Singh.

Summary
This Mohan Kumar as a student in the U.S., Mohan has "lost his virginity" at Princeton University to Jessica Brown, a beautiful black lady. Their relationship looked like a honeymoon without wedding. While still in the US, Ms Yasmeen, a Pakistani, revealed to Mohan Kumar the heady passion of a woman older than her male counterpart.

After Mohan gets back to India and settles in married life, his passion for women continues undiminished. He feels highly relieved after being divorced by his "nagging and ill-tempered" wife. But Mohan was an unfaithful husband. His sex escapades, before the divorce and post divorce were unusual and varied, including his repeated relations with his ever-obliging maid, Dhanno, with her practiced charm on the bed.

Another woman in Kumar's life was Tamilian Marry Joseph, described by the author as “a dark, plump woman in her thirties.” She worked as a nurse to Kumar's son. She has been described almost inviting Shakti Kumar tacitly with these words, “Saar, one life to live, not to waste it on a drunkard husband. You agree?” Kumar has agreed.
 
The book describes Kumar's rendezvous with madam Sarojini Bhardwaj, a Professor of English. And, when it came to sex, the lady professor proved that she was stronger than many men. Another lady appearing in the sex life of Kumar was Molly Gomes, who was “not only as an incarnation of sensual impulse, but also as a mistress of sexuality.” Likewise, Susanthika, "the small wonderful bird", from Sri Lanka was really active on bed.

20th-century Indian novels
1999 novels
Viking Press books
Novels by Khushwant Singh
1999 Indian novels